Vasil Hristov Chekalarov (Bulgarian/) or Vasil Tcakalarov (22 February 1874 – 9 July 1913) was a Bulgarian revolutionary and one of the leaders of Internal Macedonian Revolutionary Organisation in Macedonia. H. N. Brailsford described Chekalarov as the "cruel but competent general" of the Bulgarian insurgents in Macedonia. Despite his Bulgarian self-identification, and the fact he considered the adherents of Macedonist ideas to be Grecomans, per post-WWII Macedonian historiography he was an ethnic Macedonian.

He was a leading komitaji in the bands of the Bulgarian Macedonian-Adrianople Revolutionary Committees and took part in the battles against the Ottoman authorities as well before the Ilinden Uprising as after it. In 1901-1902 he created a channel for illegal purchase and transfer of firearms from Greece to Southern Macedonia. In 1904 he migrated into Bulgaria and became one of the Internal Macedonian Revolutionary Organization (IMRO) organizers of the military campaign against the Greek Struggle for Macedonia.

As a commander of a Bulgarian guerilla band, Chekalarov supported the Hellenic Army in the First Balkan War 1912-1913. Later he fought on the side of the Bulgarian Army on the front in Eastern Thrace in the composition of the Macedonian-Adrianopolitan Volunteer Corps. 

He was killed by Greek troops during the Second Balkan War and his head was publicly displayed in Florina.

In 1934 a Bulgarian village was renamed Chakalarovo in honour of Vasil Chekalarov.

External links
 Chekalarov, Vasil. Diary 1901-1903, Sofia 2001 (in Bulgarian)
 A folk song about Vasil Chakalarov at YouTube
 Лазар Поптрайков - "Въстанието в Костурско; от 20 юлий до 30 август вкл.", публикувано в "Бюлетин на в. Автономия; Задграничен лист на Вътрешната македоно-одринска организация", брой 44-47, София, 1903 година Report about the Ilinden uprising written by Lazar Poptrajkov, Vasil Chakalarov, Manol Rozov, Pando Klyashev and Mihail Nikolov

References

1874 births
1913 deaths
Bulgarians from Aegean Macedonia
Members of the Internal Macedonian Revolutionary Organization
Bulgarian military personnel of the Balkan Wars
Bulgarian revolutionaries
Macedonian Bulgarians
Balkan Wars casualties
Bulgarian military personnel killed in action
People from Florina (regional unit)